Schistura cincticauda is a species of ray-finned fish in the stone loach genus Schistura. It has been recorded from a tributary of the Salween River in Thailand, Myanmar and Laos.

References 

cincticauda
Fish described in 1860
Taxa named by Edward Blyth